The Ukrainian Institute of National Memory (UINM), also translated as the Ukrainian Institute of National Remembrance, is the central executive body operating under the Cabinet of Ministers of Ukraine. Established on 31 May 2006 as a special organ for the restoration and preservation of national memory of the Ukrainian people. From 2006 to 2010, it was a central governmental institution with a special status, while from 2010 to 2014 a research budget institution.

History
On 9 December 2010, the UINR was discontinued by a decree issued by Viktor Yanukovych and on the same day the Cabinet of Ministers of Ukraine created the Ukrainian Institute of National Remembrance as a research institution instead, within the budget from the Cabinet of Ministers of Ukraine.

According to historian Georgiy Kasianov, the Institute of National Memory from 2015 was under control of Ukrainian nationalist forces, specifically Center for Research of the Liberation Movement. These forces, which were not popular in Ukraine and which never managed well in the national elections, suddenly received a significant instrument to influence Ukrainian education and politics. This influence was blown up by Russian propaganda and used as one of the pretexts of the 2022 Russian invasion of Ukraine.

Directors 
 Ihor Yukhnovskyi, from 22 May 2006 to 18 July 2010. 
 Valeriy Soldatenko, from 19 July 2010 to 24 March 2014.
 Volodymyr Viatrovych, from 25 March 2014 to 3 December 2019.
 Anton Drobovych, from 4 December 2019.
 Alina Shpak (acting director), 2020

Decommunization of Ukraine 
In May 2015, President Petro Poroshenko signed four laws concerning decommunization in Ukraine. The institute's director Volodymyr Viatrovych was involved in the drafting of two of these laws. The criminal sentences imposed by these acts and their phrasing came in for criticism within the country and abroad. The law "On access to the archives of repressive bodies of the communist totalitarian regime from 1917–1991" placed the state archives concerning repression during the Soviet period under the jurisdiction of the Ukrainian Institute of National Remembrance.

See also 
 Polish Institute of National Remembrance

References

External links 
 Ukrainian Institute of National Remembrance on YouTube
  Official site of Ukrainian Institute of National Memory

2006 establishments in Ukraine
Cultural organizations based in Ukraine
Platform of European Memory and Conscience
History organizations based in Ukraine
Commemoration of communist crimes